Renato Macario (10 June 1920 – 30 May 2011) was an Italian rower. He competed at the 1948 Summer Olympics in London with the men's coxed four where they were eliminated in the semi-final.

References

1920 births
2011 deaths
Italian male rowers
Olympic rowers of Italy
Rowers at the 1948 Summer Olympics
Sportspeople from the Province of Bergamo
European Rowing Championships medalists
People from Lovere